Muhammad Khan Sur, also known by his regnal title Shamsuddin Muhammad Shah Ghazi, was the Sultan of Bengal from 1553 to 1555. He was initially appointed as a governor of Bengal by Emperor Islam Shah Suri of the Sur Empire in 1545, but after his death, he declared independence.

Governor of Bengal
Qazi Fazilat's term as Chief of all of the Muqtas of Bengal ended following the death of Emperor Sher Shah Suri in 1545. The next emperor, Islam Shah Suri, then appointed Muhammad Khan to govern Bengal. Muhammad peacefully governed Bengal, subordinate to the emperor. However, following Islam Shah's death in 1553, Muhammad declared independence from Delhi, effectively reestablishing the weakening Bengal Sultanate by starting his own dynasty.

Sultan of Bengal
During his reign, Muhammad Shah conquered Arakan where he began minting coins from. His issued coins bore the Shahada and the names of the four Rashidun; Abu Bakr, Omar, Uthman and Ali. This signified his Sunni Muslim religious beliefs. Unlike the Sur emperors, Muhammad Shah dropped the use of Devanagari script in coins. He also reconquered Chittagong from the Twipra Kingdom, and his legitimate authority was recognised as far as Bihar.

Vying for power in North India, Muhammad Shah conquered Jaunpur and proceeded for Delhi, the capital of the Sur Empire. In 1555, he fought a battle in Chapar Ghata against Islam Shah's successor, Adil Shah. In that battle Muhammad Shah was defeated and killed by Adil's Hindu general, Hemu.

Succession
Muhammad Shah's eldest son, Khidr, ascended the independent throne of Bengal as Ghiyasuddin Bahadur Shah II. However, Adil Shah did not recognise this as a legitimate position and he appointed Shahbaz Khan Suri to be the governor of Bengal under him.

See also
 List of rulers of Bengal
 History of Bengal
 History of India

References

Sultans of Bengal
16th-century Afghan people
16th-century Indian monarchs
1555 deaths
Indian people of Pashtun descent
Indian people of Afghan descent